Homoanarta is a genus of moths of the family Noctuidae erected by William Barnes and Foster Hendrickson Benjamin in 1923.

Species
 Homoanarta carneola (Smith, 1891)
 Homoanarta cristifer (Dyar, 1918)
 Homoanarta falcata (Neumoegen, 1884)
 Homoanarta farinosa Draudt, 1925
 Homoanarta nudor (Dyar, 1920)
 Homoanarta peralta (Barnes, 1907)
 Homoanarta senescens (Dyar, 1918)

References

Cuculliinae